Ashley Jason Delaney (born 11 April 1986) is a national-record holding and Olympic and world championship medal-winning swimmer from Australia, who competed at the 2008 Summer Olympics.

Career 
His first international success came at the 2006 Oceania Championships, where he set the Championships Records in the 50 m, 100 m and 200 m backstroke.

At the 2008 Telstra Trials he qualified in the 100 m and the 200 m backstroke, placing first and second respectively to qualify for the Olympics in Beijing. He left Beijing with a silver in the 4 × 100 m medley relay, and a fifth-place finish in the 100m backstroke.

In 2009, he won all three backstroke events at the 2009 Telstra Trials, setting national records in the 50 and 200 m. At the World Championships, with arguably Australia's strongest leg absent (freestyler Eamon Sullivan), the medley relay team was overhauled by Germany, finishing with bronze.

In 2010 Delany was bested by longtime rival Hayden Stoeckel in all three backstrokes at the Australian Championships. At the 2010 Pan Pacific Swimming Championships, Delaney won bronze in the 100 m backstroke. He backed up his form on the second night, taking silver in the 50 m. Night 3 saw him finish 4th in the 200m backstroke. On the final night Delaney collected another bronze in the medley relay.

Career Best Times

See also
 List of Commonwealth Games medallists in swimming (men)
 List of Olympic medalists in swimming (men)

References

External links
 
 
 
 
 
 
 
 

1986 births
Living people
People from Sale, Victoria
Australian male backstroke swimmers
Swimmers at the 2008 Summer Olympics
Olympic swimmers of Australia
Olympic silver medalists for Australia
Australian Institute of Sport swimmers
Commonwealth Games gold medallists for Australia
World Aquatics Championships medalists in swimming
Medalists at the FINA World Swimming Championships (25 m)
Medalists at the 2008 Summer Olympics
Olympic silver medalists in swimming
Commonwealth Games medallists in swimming
Swimmers at the 2010 Commonwealth Games
21st-century Australian people
Medallists at the 2010 Commonwealth Games